Ikoma Station (生駒駅) is a railway station in Ikoma, Nara Prefecture, Japan.

Lines
Kintetsu Railway
■Nara Line (A17)
■Ikoma Line (G17)
■Keihanna Line (C27)
Ikoma Cable Line (Y17: Toriimae Station, 鳥居前駅)

Layout
Ikoma Station
3 island platforms serving six tracks are located under the station building.

Toriimae Station
3 platforms serving two tracks are located on the ground level.

History
 April 30, 1914 - The station started operating as a station of Osaka Electric Tramway Company
 December 28, 1926 - Shigi Ikoma Electric Railway Company begins operating
 March 15, 1941 - Daiki merged with Sangu Kyuko Electric Railway Company, and was renamed Kansai Kyuko Electric Railway Company.
 June 1, 1944 - Kankyu merged Nankai Railway, and was renamed Kinki Nippon Railway Co., Ltd. (Kintetsu)
 October 1, 1964 - Shigi Ikoma merged with Kintetsu.
 October 1, 1986 - The Higashi-Osaka Line opened.
 June 28, 2003 - Kinki Nippon Railway Co., Ltd. was renamed Kintetsu Corporation.
 March 27, 2006 - The Keihanna Line began operating. The Higashi-Osaka Line was merged with the Keihanna Line
 April 1, 2007 - The station started accepting PiTaPa.

Surroundings
North
Antre Ikoma
Kintetsu Department Store
Sumitomo Mitsui Banking Corporation
Japan Books
Coco store
KONAMI Sports Club
Ikoma Post Office
Japan Post Service Ikoma
Japan Post Bank Ikoma

South
Ikoma City Hall
Green Hill Ikoma
Supermarket KINSHO
Kakinohazushi

Bus stops
Buses are operated by Nara Kotsu Bus Lines Co., Ltd.

North side
Bus Stop 1 (for Kitanjo, Kita-Tawara and Gakken Kita-Ikoma)
Route 77 (Ikomadai Outer Loop) for Kitanjo
Route 82 for Kita-Tawara via Kitanjo
Route 84 (midnight bus) for Ikomadai via Kitanjo and Shin-Ikomadai-kitaguchi
Route 189 for Gakken Kita-Ikoma via Kitanjo, Shin-Ikomadai-kitaguchi and Shiraniwadai Jutaku
Bus Stop 2 (for Ikomadai)
Route 78 (Ikomadai Inner Loop) for Ikomadai
Route 80 for Shin-Ikomadai-kitaguchi via Ikomadai
Ikoma City Community Bus "Takemaru" for Koyodai-chuo-koen

South side
Bus Stop 1 (for Higashi-Ikoma, Oze, Inakura and Asukano)
Route 63 for Oze Hoken Fukushi Zone via Higashi-Ikoma and Satsukidai Jutaku
Route 64 for Asukano Center via Higashi-Ikoma and Satsukidai Jutaku
Route 65 for Asukano Center and Asukano-minami via Higashi-Ikoma and Satsukidai Jutaku
Route 90 for Naka-Nabata Nichome
Route 165 for Shiraniwadai via Higashi-Ikoma, Inakura and Asukano Center
Route 168 for Hikarigaoka via Higashi-Ikoma, Inakura, Asukano Center and Shiraniwadai
Ikoma City Community Bus "Takemaru" for Ikoma City Hall
Bus Stop 2 (for Tawaradai)
Route 79 for Tawaradai Itchome via Kitatani-koen
Route 85 for Tawaradai Kyuchome-nishi via Tawaradai Hatchome
Route 86 for Tawaradai Itchome via Tawaradai Hatchome
Route 96 for Tawaradai Itchome via Tawaradai Hatchome and Tawaradai Kyuchome-nishi
Tawaradai is a district in Shijonawate, Osaka Prefecture.

Adjacent stations to Ikoma or Toriimae

References

Railway stations in Japan opened in 1914
Railway stations in Nara Prefecture